Meneath: The Hidden Island of Ethics is a Canadian animated short film, directed by Terril Calder and released in 2021. The film centres on a young Métis girl (Lake Delisle) who is torn between Jesus (Kent McQuaid) teaching her about the seven deadly sins, and Nokomis (Gail Maurice) telling her of the Seven Sacred Teachings. The film premiered at the 2021 Toronto International Film Festival, and was subsequently screened at the 2021 Vancouver International Film Festival.

The film was named to TIFF's annual year-end Canada's Top Ten list for 2021, and received a Canadian Screen Award nomination for Best Animated Short at the 10th Canadian Screen Awards in 2022.

Reception 
Since its release, the film has been selected in various festivals and academies around the world:

References

External links

2021 films
2021 animated films
2021 short films
Canadian animated short films
National Film Board of Canada animated short films
Métis film
2020s English-language films
2020s Canadian films